Lufeng railway station is a railway station of Chengdu–Kunming Railway in Lufeng County, Yunnan, China.

See also
Chengdu–Kunming Railway

Railway stations in Yunnan
Railway stations in China opened in 1966
Transport in Chuxiong Yi Autonomous Prefecture